Victor George Axiak (born 20 August 1981) is a Maltese Magistrate. He is a graduate of the University of Malta.

See also 

 Judiciary of Malta

References 

1981 births
Living people
21st-century Maltese judges
University of Malta alumni